Semantics is the linguistic and philosophical study of meaning in language.

Semantics may also refer to:

 Semantics (computer science), the mathematical study of the meaning of programming languages
 Semantics of logic, the study of the interpretations of formal and natural languages
 Semantics (psychology), the study of meaning within psychology

Books
 Semantics (Lyons book), book by Sir John Lyons
 Semantics (Saeed book), book by John I. Saeed
Semantics: the Study of Meaning, book by Geoffrey Leech